Virginia's 95th House of Delegates district elects one of the 100 members of the Virginia House of Delegates, the lower house of the state's bicameral legislature.  District 95 represents part of the cities of Hampton and Newport News. The seat is currently held by Marcia S. (Cia) Price.

List of delegates

References

Virginia House of Delegates districts
Hampton, Virginia
Newport News, Virginia